The Outsider is a 1939 British drama film directed by Paul L. Stein and starring George Sanders, Mary Maguire and Barbara Blair. The screenplay concerns an osteopath who cures one of his patients with whom he has fallen in love. It is a remake of the 1931 film The Outsider and was based on the 1923 play of the same name by Dorothy Brandon. The film was shot at Elstree Studios with sets designed by the art director Cedric Dawe.

Plot
Anton Ragatzy is an infamous osteopath, known for his controversial methods of curing disability. Ragatzy uses a machine invented by himself which will either cure the patients permanently or will leave them disabled forever.

A board of surgeons disagree with Ragatzy's methods and want to ban him from acting as an osteopath. Ragatzy wants to change their minds and decides to cure the daughter of one of the surgeons, Joseph Sturdee. Lalage "Lally" Sturdee has been disabled since birth and lives with her fiercely protective father. She composes famous musical scores and is in love with her close friend Basil.

Ragatzy manages to meet Lally and offers her treatment, but she refuses. However, when she sees Basil and her friends having fun swimming while she is unable to join in, she changes her mind and contacts Ragatzy. Ragatzy promises to help her and invites her to live in his house for one year while the treatment takes place so that she can receive the best care.

Ragatzy knows of Lally's love for Basil and believes that it will help in her treatment. Basil has fallen in love with another woman, Wendy, but continues to visit Lally out of a sense of duty. Ragatzy finds that he is falling in love with Lally, but keeps his distance. Basil promises to visit Lally on New Year's Eve but instead sees the New Year in with Wendy. To spare her feelings, Ragatzy buys flowers for Lally and pretends they are from Basil.

Lally completes her treatment and Ragatzy arranges for the board of surgeons to be present while Lally takes her first steps. Basil promises Wendy that if Lally can walk, he will marry her, but if Lally is still disabled, he must stay with her. Ragatzy and Lally realise their feelings for each other. He helps her to her feet, but the surgeons are still suspicious. Ragatzy encourages Lalage to walk, but she confesses that she can't. The surgeons leave and Lally carries on trying to walk but keeps falling. Ragatzy expresses his frustration that he will now be unable to carry on practising, while Lally is furious that Ragatzy is only concerned with his reputation. Joseph Sturdee arrives and is angered that his daughter is disabled for life, and hits Ragatzy. Lally hears the commotion and walks over to defend Ragatzy. The film ends with Lally united with her father and Ragatzy.

Main cast
 George Sanders as Anton Ragatzy
 Mary Maguire as Lalage Sturdee
 Barbara Blair as Wendy
 Peter Murray-Hill as Basil Owen
 Frederick Leister as Joseph Sturdee
 Walter Hudd as Dr. Helmore
 Kathleen Harrison as Mrs. Coates
 Kynaston Reeves as Sir Montague Tollemach
 Edmund Breon as Dr. Ladd
 Ralph Truman as Sir Nathan Israel

References

External links

1939 drama films
1939 films
Films shot at Associated British Studios
Films directed by Paul L. Stein
British drama films
Films set in London
Remakes of British films
British black-and-white films
1930s English-language films
1930s British films